The Rugged Priest is a 2011 Kenyan biographical film directed by Bob Nyanja.  It is based on the life and death of John Anthony Kaiser.

Cast
Jason Corder as American Ambassador
Lwanda Jawar as Father Ian
Oliver Litondo as Catholic Bishop
Serah Ndanu as Alice
Ainea Ojiambo as Ole Shompole
Colin Simpson as Father John Kalser

Accolade
The film won the Golden Dhow Award at the Zanzibar International Film Festival.

References

External links
 

2011 films
Kenyan drama films
English-language Kenyan films
2010s English-language films